The 1970–71 Milwaukee Bucks season was the third season for the Bucks. Milwaukee posted a 66–16 record in only its third year of existence, and its second since drafting Lew Alcindor (later known as Kareem Abdul-Jabbar). A key part of this championship season was the acquisition of Oscar Robertson. Other role players on the Bucks included players such as Bob Dandridge (18.4 ppg), Jon McGlocklin (15.8 ppg), power forward Greg Smith & key reserves such as Lucius Allen, Bob Boozer and Dick Cunningham completing the nucleus. This season included a 20-game winning streak, the NBA's longest at the time, and still ranked fifth all-time. The Bucks became the first team from the Midwest Division to win the NBA title; it would be 23 years before the Houston Rockets would do the same.

In the 1971 NBA Playoffs, the Bucks defeated the 4th-seeded Warriors in 5 games. In the Western Conference Finals, the team dispatched the Lakers in 5 games. The Bucks made their way into the Finals for the first time in NBA history in just their third year of existence. They faced off against the Baltimore Bullets and swept them in four games. The Bucks had won their first title in franchise history. Lew Alcindor won MVP and Finals MVP honors.

Draft picks

The Milwaukee Bucks made ten selections in the 1970 NBA draft.

Roster

Regular season
In only his second professional season, Lew Alcindor led the league in scoring at 31.7 ppg, ranked second in field goal percentage at .577 and fourth in rebounding at 16.0 rpg. Newly arrived Oscar Robertson turned 32 early in the 1970–71 season, and was past his prime when he came to Milwaukee, but his versatile skills and experience provided a leadership role for the Bucks. Robertson had never won a championship and his desire to win seemed to inspire Alcindor and unite the rest of the Bucks. Robertson ranked third in the league in assists at 8.3 apg and was the Bucks' No. 2 scorer at 19.4 ppg.

Standings

Record vs. opponents

Game log

|-style="background:#bbffbb;"
| 1 || October 17, 1970 || @ Atlanta
| W 107–98
|Lew Alcindor (32)
|Lew Alcindor (17)
|Oscar Robertson (4)
| Alexander Memorial Coliseum
| 1-0
|-style="background:#fcc;"
| 2 || October 20, 1970 || @ Detroit
| L 114–115
|Lew Alcindor (38)
|Lew Alcindor (16)
|Oscar Robertson (11)
| Cobo Center
| 1-1
|-style="background:#bbffbb;"
| 3 || October 24, 1970 || Baltimore
| W 122–120 2OT
|Lew Alcindor (39)
|Lew Alcindor (17)
|
| Milwaukee Arena
| 2–1
|-style="background:#bbffbb;"
| 4 || October 25, 1970 || Seattle
| W 126–107
|Lew Alcindor (37)
|Lew Alcindor (14)
|Oscar Robertson (13)
| Milwaukee Arena
| 3–1
|-style="background:#bbffbb;"
| 5 || October 27, 1970 || San Diego
| W 126–113
|Bob Dandridge (39)
|Lew Alcindor & Dick Cunningham (10)
|Oscar Robertson (8)
| Milwaukee Arena
| 4–1
|-style="background:#bbffbb;"
| 6 || October 31, 1970 || @ Cincinnati
| W 121–100
|Lew Alcindor (28)
|Lew Alcindor (22)
|Bob Dandridge (9)
| Cincinnati Gardens
| 5-1

|-style="background:#bbffbb;"
| 7 || November 4, 1970 || @ Cleveland
| W 110–108
|Lew Alcindor (53)
|Lew Alcindor (11)
|Bob Dandridge & Jon McGlocklin (9)
| Cleveland Arena
| 6–1
|-style="background:#bbffbb;"
| 8 || November 8, 1970 || Phoenix
| W 125–105
|Bob Dandridge (32)
|Bob Dandridge (14)
|Oscar Robertson & Jon McGlocklin (9)
| Milwaukee Arena
| 7–1
|-style="background:#bbffbb;"
| 9 || November 11, 1970 || @ Boston
| W 123–113
|Lew Alcindor (44)
|Lew Alcindor (15)
|Oscar Robertson (10)
| Boston Garden
| 8–1
|-style="background:#bbffbb;"
| 10 || November 14, 1970 || @ Buffalo
| W 116–107
|Lew Alcindor (27)
|Lew Alcindor (20)
|Lew Alcindor (7)
| Buffalo Memorial Auditorium
| 9–1
|-style="background:#bbffbb;"
| 11 || November 15, 1970 || Baltimore
| W 105–90
|Lew Alcindor & Oscar Robertson (27)
|Lew Alcindor (21)
|Oscar Robertson (12)
| Milwaukee Arena
| 10–1
|-style="background:#bbffbb;"
| 12 || November 16, 1970 || San Francisco
| W 119–100
|Lew Alcindor (30)
|Bob Dandridge (14)
|Oscar Robertson (10)
| Milwaukee Arena
| 11–1
|-style="background:#bbffbb;"
| 13 || November 18, 1970 || @ San Diego
| W 117–111
|Lew Alcindor (25)
|Lew Alcindor (16)
|Oscar Robertson (6)
| San Diego Sports Arena
| 12–1
|-style="background:#bbffbb;"
| 14 || November 20, 1970 || @ Los Angeles
| W 117–100
|Lew Alcindor (29)
|Lew Alcindor (13)
|Lucius Allen (5)
| The Forum
| 13–1
|-style="background:#bbffbb;"
| 15 || November 21, 1970 || @ San Francisco
| W 127–102
|Lew Alcindor (28)
|Lew Alcindor (15)
|Oscar Robertson (9)
| Cow Palace
| 14–1
|-style="background:#bbffbb;"
| 16 || November 22, 1970 || @ Portland
| W 126–104
|Lew Alcindor (30)
|Lew Alcindor (26)
|Oscar Robertson (9)
| Memorial Coliseum
| 15–1
|-style="background:#bbffbb;"
| 17 || November 24, 1970 || @ Chicago
| W 117–108
|Lew Alcindor (37)
|Lew Alcindor (15)
|Oscar Robertson (12)
| Chicago Stadium
| 16–1
|-style="background:#bbffbb;"
| 18 || November 25, 1970 || Detroit
| W 113–87
|Lew Alcindor (31)
|Lew Alcindor & Greg Smith (17)
|Oscar Robertson (9)
| Milwaukee Arena
| 17–1
|-style="background:#fcc;"
| 19 || November 27, 1970 || New York
| L 94–103
|Lew Alcindor (33)
|Lew Alcindor (16)
|Oscar Robertson (7)
| Milwaukee Arena
| 17–2
|-style="background:#fcc;"
| 20 || November 28, 1970 || @ New York
| L 99-100
|Lew Alcindor (35)
|Lew Alcindor (24)
|Oscar Robertson (5)
| Madison Square Garden
| 17-3
|-style="background:#bbffbb;"
| 21 || November 29, 1970 ||Portland
| W 124-111
|Lew Alcindor (33)
|Greg Smith (14)
|Oscar Robertson (13)
| Milwaukee Arena
| 18-3

|-style="background:#bbffbb;"
| 22 || December 3, 1970 || Chicago
| W 107–100
|Lew Alcindor & Oscar Robertson (22)
|Lew Alcindor (10)
|Lew Alcindor (7)
| Milwaukee Arena
| 19–3
|-style="background:#bbffbb;"
| 23 || December 4, 1970 || Philadelphia
| W 128–122 (OT)
|Lew Alcindor (35)
|Lew Alcindor (18)
|Jon McGlocklin (9)
| Milwaukee Arena
| 20–3
|-style="background:#bbffbb;"
| 24 || December 8, 1970 || Atlanta
| W 125–104
|Lew Alcindor (24)
|Lew Alcindor (13)
|Oscar Robertson (13)
| Milwaukee Arena
| 21–3
|-style="background:#fcc;"
| 25 || December 9, 1970 || @ Baltimore
| L 97–127
|Lew Alcindor (24)
|Lew Alcindor (15)
|Lew Alcindor (4)
| Baltimore Civic Center
| 21–4
|-style="background:#bbffbb;"
| 26 || December 11, 1970 || Cleveland
| W 134–92
|Lew Alcindor (34)
|Lew Alcindor (17)
|Oscar Robertson (13)
| Milwaukee Arena
| 22–4
|-style="background:#fcc;"
| 27 || December 12, 1970 || @ Phoenix
| L 111–113
|Lew Alcindor (36)
|Lew Alcindor (17)
|Oscar Robertson (12)
| Arizona Veterans Memorial Coliseum
| 22–5
|-style="background:#bbffbb;"
| 28 || December 13, 1970 || @ Seattle
| W 124–107
|Lew Alcindor (40)
|Lew Alcindor (22)
|Oscar Robertson (5)
| Seattle Center Coliseum
| 23-5
|-style="background:#bbffbb;"
| 29 || December 18, 1970 || Boston
| W 124–114
|Lew Alcindor (40)
|Lew Alcindor (15)
|Greg Smith (10)
| Milwaukee Arena
| 24–5
|-style="background:#fcc;"
| 30 || December 19, 1970 || @ Cincinnati
| L 110-119
|Lew Alcindor (35)
|Lew Alcindor (20)
|Jon McGlocklin (6)
| Cincinnati Gardens
| 24-6
|-style="background:#bbffbb;"
| 31 || December 20, 1970 || Buffalo
| W 131–101
|Lew Alcindor (27)
|Lew Alcindor (13)
|Oscar Robertson (11)
| Milwaukee Arena
| 25–6
|-style="background:#bbffbb;"
| 32 || December 21, 1970 || Los Angeles
| W 113-88
|Lew Alcindor (37)
|Lew Alcindor (16)
|Oscar Robertson (10)
| Milwaukee Arena
| 26–6
|-style="background:#bbffbb;"
| 33 || December 26, 1970 || San Francisco
| W 131-111
|Lew Alcindor (34)
|Lew Alcindor (15)
|Oscar Robertson (7)
| Milwaukee Arena
| 27–6
|-style="background:#bbffbb;"
| 34 || December 28, 1970 || @ Cincinnati
| W 137-114
|Lew Alcindor (29)
|Lew Alcindor (15)
|Greg Smith (8)
| UW Field House
| 28-6
|-style="background:#bbffbb;"
| 35 || December 29, 1970 || @ Cleveland
| W 119-97
|Lew Alcindor & Bob Dandridge (23)
|Lew Alcindor (15)
|Oscar Robertson (13)
| Cleveland Arena
| 29-6
|-style="background:#fcc;"
| 36 || December 30, 1970 || @ Philadelphia
| L 107-119
|Lew Alcindor (30)
|Lew Alcindor (18)
|Oscar Robertson (8)
| The Spectrum
| 29-7

|-style="background:#bbffbb;"
| 37 || January 2, 1971 || Cleveland
| W 118-73
|Lew Alcindor (27)
|Bob Boozer (14)
|Oscar Robertson (8)
| Milwaukee Arena
| 30–7
|-style="background:#bbffbb;"
| 38 || January 4, 1971 || Seattle
| W 124-110
|Lew Alcindor (38)
|Lew Alcindor (14)
|Oscar Robertson (7)
| Milwaukee Arena
| 31–7
|-style="background:#bbffbb;"
| 39 || January 6, 1971 || @ Chicago
| W 119-106
|Lew Alcindor (24)
|Lew Alcindor & Bob Boozer (9)
|Oscar Robertson (10)
| UW Field House
| 32-7
|-style="background:#bbffbb;"
| 40 || January 7, 1971 || New York
| W 116-106
|Oscar Robertson (35)
|Lew Alcindor (13)
|Oscar Robertson (13)
| Milwaukee Arena
| 33–7
|-style="background:#bbffbb;"
| 41 || January 9, 1971 || Detroit
| W 118-100
|Lew Alcindor (27)
|Lew Alcindor (14)
|Lew Alcindor (10)
| Milwaukee Arena
| 34–7
|-style="background:#bbffbb;"
| 42 || January 10, 1971 || Baltimore
| W 151-99
|Bob Dandridge (34)
|Lew Alcindor (17)
|Oscar Robertson (9)
| Milwaukee Arena
| 35–7
|-style="background:#bbffbb;"
| 43 || January 15, 1971 || Cincinnati
| W 135-116
|Lew Alcindor (35)
|Lew Alcindor (16)
|Lew Alcindor & Oscar Robertson (5)
| Milwaukee Arena
| 36-7
|-style="background:#bbffbb;"
| 44 || January 16, 1971 || @ Chicago
| W 110-90
|Lew Alcindor (25)
|Lew Alcindor (19)
|Lew Alcindor & Oscar Robertson (8)
| Chicago Stadium
| 37-7
|-style="background:#bbffbb;"
| 45 || January 17, 1971 || Boston
| W 120–113
|Lew Alcindor (44)
|Lew Alcindor (20)
|Lew Alcindor, Jon McGlocklin, Bob Dandridge, & Oscar Robertson (5)
| Milwaukee Arena
| 38-7
|-style="background:#bbffbb;"
| 46 || January 20, 1971 || @ Baltimore
| W 120-116
|Lew Alcindor (39)
|Lew Alcindor (20)
|Bob Dandridge (5)
| Baltimore Civic Center
| 39-7
|-style="background:#fcc;"
| 47 || January 22, 1971 || Atlanta
| L 110–117
|Bob Dandridge (22)
|Lew Alcindor (20)
|Oscar Robertson (8)
| Milwaukee Arena
| 39–8
|-style="background:#bbffbb;"
| 48 || January 23, 1971 || Portland
| W 142–117
|Lew Alcindor (44)
|Lew Alcindor (17)
|Lew Alcindor (7)
| Milwaukee Arena
| 40–8
|-style="background:#bbffbb;"
| 49 || January 24, 1971 || @ Atlanta
| W 142-120
|Bob Dandridge (33)
|Lew Alcindor (17)
|Oscar Robertson (15)
| Alexander Memorial Coliseum
| 41-8
|-style="background:#fcc;"
| 50 || January 26, 1971 || @ New York
| L 98-107
|Lew Alcindor (29)
|Lew Alcindor (25)
|Lew Alcindor (4)
| Madison Square Garden
| 41-9
|-style="background:#bbffbb;"
| 51 || January 27, 1971 || @ Boston
| W 132-129
|Lew Alcindor (53)
|Lew Alcindor (14)
|Lew Alcindor & Oscar Robertson (7)
| Boston Garden
| 42-9
|-style="background:#bbffbb;"
| 52 || January 29, 1971 || @ Philadelphia
| W 142-118
|Lew Alcindor (31)
|Lew Alcindor (13)
|Lew Alcindor & Oscar Robertson (6)
| The Spectrum
| 43-9
|-style="background:#bbffbb;"
| 53 || January 31, 1971 || @ Detroit
| W 131-104
|Lew Alcindor (28)
|Bob Dandridge (15)
|Oscar Robertson (7)
| Wisconsin Field House
| 44-9

|-style="background:#fcc;"
| 54 || February 2, 1971 || @ Portland
| L 111-123
|Lew Alcindor (38)
|Lew Alcindor & Bob Boozer (9)
|Oscar Robertson (9)
| Memorial Coliseum
| 44-10
|-style="background:#bbffbb;"
| 55 || February 3, 1971 || @ San Diego
| W 108-101
|Lew Alcindor (25)
|Lew Alcindor (12)
|Oscar Robertson (10)
| San Diego Sports Arena
| 45-10
|-style="background:#fcc;"
| 56 || February 5, 1971 || @ Los Angeles
| L 93–116
|Lew Alcindor (27)
|Lew Alcindor (10)
|Oscar Robertson (7)
| The Forum
| 45-11
|-style="background:#bbffbb;"
| 57 || February 6, 1971 || @ San Francisco
| W 111-85
|Bob Dandridge & Jon McGlocklin (20)
|Lew Alcindor (11)
|Oscar Robertson (11)
| Cow Palace
| 46-11
|-style="background:#bbffbb;"
| 58 || February 8, 1971 || Phoenix
| W 118-94
|Lew Alcindor (39)
|Lew Alcindor (23)
|Oscar Robertson (12)
| Milwaukee Arena
| 47-11
|-style="background:#bbffbb;"
| 59 || February 9, 1971 || @ Detroit
| W 107-106
|Lew Alcindor (38)
|Lew Alcindor (16)
|Oscar Robertson (14)
| Cobo Center
| 48-11
|-style="background:#bbffbb;"
| 60 || February 11, 1971 || Los Angeles
| W 122-88
|Lew Alcindor (31)
|Lew Alcindor (21)
|Oscar Robertson (9)
| Milwaukee Arena
| 49-11
|-style="background:#bbffbb;"
| 61 || February 13, 1971 || Chicago
| W 103–96
|Lew Alcindor (35)
|Lew Alcindor (20)
|Oscar Robertson (9)
| Milwaukee Arena
| 50–11
|-style="background:#bbffbb;"
| 62 || February 14, 1971 || @ Atlanta
| W 124-88
|Lew Alcindor (23)
|Lew Alcindor (19)
|John McGlocklin (11)
| Alexander Memorial Coliseum
| 51–11
|-style="background:#bbffbb;"
| 63 || February 16, 1971 || @ Buffalo
| W 135-103
|Lew Alcindor (38)
|Lew Alcindor (20)
|Bob Dandridge (8)
| Buffalo Memorial Auditorium
| 52–11
|-style="background:#bbffbb;"
| 64 || February 17, 1971 || Philadelphia
| W 119-114
|Lew Alcindor (41)
|Lew Alcindor (13)
|Oscar Robertson (9)
| Wisconsin Field House
| 53–11
|-style="background:#bbffbb;"
| 65 || February 19, 1971 || @ Seattle
| W 128-112
|Lew Alcindor (42)
|Lew Alcindor (29)
|Oscar Robertson (8)
| Seattle Center Coliseum
| 54–11
|-style="background:#bbffbb;"
| 66 || February 20, 1971 || @ San Francisco
| W 104-96
|Jon McGlocklin (28)
|Lew Alcindor (19)
|Oscar Robertson (11)
| Cow Palace
| 55–11
|-style="background:#bbffbb;"
| 67 || February 21, 1971 || @ Phoenix
| W 125–97
|Lew Alcindor (36)
|Lew Alcindor (21)
|Oscar Robertson (10)
| Arizona Veterans Memorial Coliseum
| 56–11
|-style="background:#bbffbb;"
| 68 || February 23, 1971 || San Francisco
| W 118–107
|Oscar Robertson (26)
|Lew Alcindor (16)
|Oscar Robertson (6)
| Milwaukee Arena
| 57–11
|-style="background:#bbffbb;"
| 69 || February 24, 1971 || San Diego
| W 139–104
|Bob Dandridge (33)
|Lew Alcindor & Greg Smith (13)
|Oscar Robertson (8)
| Milwaukee Arena
| 58–11
|-style="background:#bbffbb;"
| 70 || February 26, 1971 || Cincinnati
| W 135–111
|Lew Alcindor, Jon McGlocklin, & Bob Dandridge (24)
|Lew Alcindor (22)
|Oscar Robertson (9)
| Milwaukee Arena
| 59–11
|-style="background:#bbffbb;"
| 71 || February 28, 1971 || @ Boston
|W 111–99
|Lew Alcindor (26)
|Lew Alcindor (30)
|Oscar Robertson (5)
| Boston Garden
| 60–11

|-style="background:#bbffbb;"
| 72 || March 1, 1971 || Philadelphia
| W 127–103
| Lew Alcindor & Oscar Robertson (29)
| Oscar Robertson (12)
| Oscar Robertson (10)
| Milwaukee Arena
| 61–11
|-style="background:#bbffbb;"
| 73 || March 3, 1971 || Los Angeles
| W 112–97
| Oscar Robertson (24)
| Bob Dandridge (8)
| Greg Smith (7)
| Milwaukee Arena
| 62–11
|-style="background:#bbffbb;"
| 74 || March 4, 1971 || Buffalo
| W 113–116
| Oscar Robertson (32)
| Lew Alcindor (17)
| Oscar Robertson (9)
| Milwaukee Arena
| 63–11
|-style="background:#bbffbb;"
| 75 || March 5, 1971 || @ Detroit
| W 108–95
| Lew Alcindor (34)
| Lew Alcindor (11)
| Oscar Robertson (16)
| Cobo Arena
| 64–11
|-style="background:#bbffbb;"
| 76 || March 8, 1971 || Seattle
| W 99–104
| Lew Alcindor (32)
| Lew Alcindor (16)
| Jon McGlocklin & Oscar Robertson  (7)
| Milwaukee Arena
| 65–11
|-style="background:#fcc;"
| 77 || March 9, 1971 || @ Chicago
| L 103–110 (OT)
| Lew Alcindor (39)
| Lew Alcindor (17)
| Oscar Robertson (8)
| Chicago Stadium
| 65–12
|-style="background:#fcc;"
| 78 || March 13, 1971 || @ New York
| L 103–108
| Lew Alcindor (34)
| Lew Alcindor (16)
| Jon McGlocklin (5)
| Madison Square Garden
| 65–13
|-style="background:#fcc;"
| 79 || March 14, 1971 || Phoenix
| L 125–113
| Lew Alcindor (38)
| Lew Alcindor (15)
| Greg Smith (6)
| Wisconsin Field House
| 65–14
|-style="background:#bbffbb;"
| 80 || March 16, 1971 || @ Phoenix
| W 119–111
| Lew Alcindor (48)
| Lew Alcindor (14)
| Oscar Robertson (13)
| Arizona Veterans Memorial Coliseum
| 66–14
|-style="background:#fcc;"
| 81 || March 18, 1971 || @ Seattle
| L 121–122
| Lew Alcindor (39)
| Lew Alcindor (13)
| Greg Smith (7)
| Seattle Center Coliseum
| 66–15
|-style="background:#fcc;"
| 82 || March 19, 1971 || @ San Diego
| L 99–111
| Lew Alcindor (22)
| Dick Cunningham (12)
| Bob Greacen (8)
| San Diego Sports Arena
| 66–16

Playoffs

|- align="center" bgcolor="#ccffcc"
| 1
| March 27
| @ San Francisco
| W 107–96
| Oscar Robertson (31)
| Alcindor, Smith (10)
| Oscar Robertson (9)
| Oakland–Alameda County Coliseum Arena11,216
| 1–0
|- align="center" bgcolor="#ccffcc"
| 2
| March 29
| San Francisco
| W 104–90
| Lew Alcindor (26)
| Lew Alcindor (18)
| Oscar Robertson (7)
| University of Wisconsin Field House12,868
| 2–0
|- align="center" bgcolor="#ccffcc"
| 3
| March 30
| San Francisco
| W 114–102
| Lew Alcindor (33)
| Lew Alcindor (12)
| Lucius Allen (8)
| University of Wisconsin Field House12,868
| 3–0
|- align="center" bgcolor="#ffcccc"
| 4
| April 1
| @ San Francisco
| L 104–106
| Lew Alcindor (32)
| Lew Alcindor (21)
| Lucius Allen (6)
| Oakland–Alameda County Coliseum Arena7,615
| 3–1
|- align="center" bgcolor="#ccffcc"
| 5
| April 4
| San Francisco
| W 136–86
| Jon McGlocklin (28)
| Lew Alcindor (17)
| Lucius Allen (7)
| University of Wisconsin Field House12,868
| 4–1
|-

|- align="center" bgcolor="#ccffcc"
| 1
| April 9
| Los Angeles
| W 106–85
| Lew Alcindor (32)
| Lew Alcindor (22)
| Oscar Robertson (10)
| Milwaukee Arena10,746
| 1–0
|- align="center" bgcolor="#ccffcc"
| 2
| April 11
| Los Angeles
| W 91–73
| Lew Alcindor (22)
| Bob Dandridge (11)
| Oscar Robertson (7)
| Milwaukee Arena10,746
| 2–0
|- align="center" bgcolor="#ffcccc"
| 3
| April 14
| @ Los Angeles
| L 107–118
| Bob Dandridge (25)
| Lew Alcindor (19)
| Oscar Robertson (9)
| The Forum17,334
| 2–1
|- align="center" bgcolor="#ccffcc"
| 4
| April 16
| @ Los Angeles
| W 117–94
| Lew Alcindor (31)
| Lew Alcindor (20)
| Oscar Robertson (6)
| The Forum17,505
| 3–1
|- align="center" bgcolor="#ccffcc"
| 5
| April 18
| Los Angeles
| W 116–98
| Greg Smith (22)
| Alcindor, Dandridge (15)
| Oscar Robertson (12)
| Milwaukee Arena10,746
| 4–1
|-

|- align="center" bgcolor="#ccffcc"
| 1
| April 21
| Baltimore
| W 98–88
| Lew Alcindor (31)
| Lew Alcindor (17)
| Oscar Robertson (7)
| Milwaukee Arena10,746
| 1–0
|- align="center" bgcolor="#ccffcc"
| 2
| April 25
| @ Baltimore
| W 102–83
| Lew Alcindor (27)
| Lew Alcindor (24)
| Oscar Robertson (10)
| Baltimore Civic Center12,289
| 2–0
|- align="center" bgcolor="#ccffcc"
| 3
| April 28
| Baltimore
| W 107–99
| Bob Dandridge (29)
| Lew Alcindor (21)
| Oscar Robertson (12)
| Milwaukee Arena10,746
| 3–0
|- align="center" bgcolor="#ccffcc"
| 4
| April 30
| @ Baltimore
| W 118–106
| Oscar Robertson (30)
| Alcindor, Dandridge (12)
| Oscar Robertson (9)
| Baltimore Civic Center11,842
| 4–0
|-

Player statistics

Season

Playoffs

Awards and records
 Lew Alcindor, NBA scoring champion
 Lew Alcindor, NBA MVP
 Lew Alcindor, NBA Finals MVP

Transactions
On April 21, 1970, the Bucks traded two young players, Flynn Robinson and Charlie Paulk, to the Cincinnati Royals for 10-year veteran guard Oscar Robertson.

Trades

Free Agents

See also
 List of National Basketball Association longest winning streaks

Notes

References

 Bucks on Database Basketball
 Bucks on Basketball Reference
 

Milwaukee
Milwaukee Bucks seasons
Western Conference (NBA) championship seasons
NBA championship seasons
Milwau
Milwau